Ramayapalem is a small village located in Marripudi Mandal, Prakasam district in the state of Andhra Pradesh, India.

References

External links
Draft Electoral Rolls - http://ceoandhra.nic.in/final_pdf_2010.html 
Draft Electoral Rolls - http://ceo.ap.gov.in/counter1/final_pdf_show_delimit.asp?strconst=AC229&strps=012&strlang=T

Villages in Prakasam district